Changkat Jering (Jawi: چڠكت جريڠ) is a small town in Larut, Matang and Selama District, Perak, Malaysia. It connects Taiping to the North–South Expressway via the southern exit. Changkat Jering is famed for its big weekly evening market on Saturdays. Changkat Jering is situated within the parliamentary constituency of Bukit Gantang.

Secondary Schools in Changkat Jering 
1.  SMK Tengku Menteri 
2.  SMK Dato' Wan Ahmad Rasdi – Official school website in the national language

Primary Schools in Changkat Jering 
 SK Changkat Jering
 SK Sultan Abdullah, Kg Cheh, Bukit Gantang
 SK Jelutong, Kg Jelutong, Changkat Jering
 SJK(C) Yuk Chuen, Jalan Besar, Changkat Jering

Towns in Perak